The Kennesaw State Owls baseball team represents Kennesaw State University, which is located in Kennesaw, Georgia. The Owls are an NCAA Division I college baseball program that competes in the ASUN Conference. They began competing in Division I in 2006 and joined the ASUN Conference the same season.

The Kennesaw State Owls play all home games on campus at Fred Stillwell Stadium. Under the direction of Head Coach Mike Sansing, the Owls have played in one NCAA Tournament. Over their fifteen seasons in the ASUN Conference, they have won one ASUN regular season title and two ASUN tournaments.

Since the program's inception in 1984, eight Owls have gone on to play in Major League Baseball, highlighted by 2005 World Series champion Willie Harris. Over the program's 37 seasons, 55 Owls have been drafted, including Max Pentecost and Chad Jenkins who were selected in the first round of the 2014 and 2009 drafts, respectively.

Before joining the NCAA in 1994, the Owls additionally won the NAIA World Series in 1994.

Conference membership history (Division I only) 
2006–present: ASUN Conference

Fred Stillwell Stadium 

Fred Stillwell Stadium is a baseball stadium on the Kennesaw State campus in Kennesaw, Georgia, that seats 900 people. It opened in 1984. A record attendance of 1,314 was set on April 3, 2012 in a game against Georgia Tech.

Head coaches (Division I only) 
Records taken from the 2020 KSU baseball record book.

Year-by-year NCAA Division I results
Records taken from the 2020 KSU baseball record book.

NCAA Division I Tournament history
The NCAA Division I baseball tournament started in 1947.
The format of the tournament has changed through the years.
Kennesaw State began playing Division I baseball in 2006.

Awards and honors (Division I only)

 Over their 15 seasons in Division I, two Owls have been named to an NCAA-recognized All-America team.
 Over their 15 seasons in the ASUN Conference, 18 different Owls have been named to the all-conference first-team.

Johnny Bench/Buster Posey Award

All-Americans

Freshman All-Americans

ASUN Conference Player of the Year

ASUN Conference Defensive Player of the Year

ASUN Conference Pitcher of the Year

ASUN Conference Coach of the Year

ASUN Conference Freshman of the Year

Taken from the 2020 KSU baseball record book. Updated March 15, 2020.

Owls in the Major Leagues

Taken from the KSU MLB draft history. Updated March 15, 2020.

See also
List of NCAA Division I baseball programs

References